Kraton may refer to:

Kraton (Indonesia), an Indonesian name for palace
Kraton, East Java, a subdistrict located in Pasuruan Regency, East Java, Indonesia
Kraton, Yogyakarta, a subdistrict located in Yogyakarta, Special Region of Yogyakarta, Indonesia
Kraton (polymer), a family of polymers produced by Kraton Corporation
Craton, an old and stable part of the continental crust, formerly spelled kraton